Events from the year 1667 in China.

Incumbents 
 Kangxi Emperor (6th year)
 Regents — Sonin, Ebilun, Suksaha, and Oboi

Viceroys
 Viceroy of Zhili, Shandong and Henan — Zhu Changzuo (–January 8), Bai Bingzhen (January 27–)
 Viceroy of Zhejiang — Zhao Tingchen
 Viceroy of Fujian — Zhang Chaolin 
 Viceroy of Huguang — Zhang Changgeng
 Viceroy of Shan-Shaan — Lu Chongjun
 Viceroy of Liangguang — Lu Xingzu 
 Viceroy of Yun-Gui — Bian Sanyuan 
 Viceroy of Sichuan — Miao Cheng
 Viceroy of Jiangnan —  Lang Tingzuo

Events 
 Puti Temple or Bodhi Temple, a Buddhist temple located in Mangshi of Dehong Dai and Jingpo Autonomous Prefecture is built in Yunnan province.
 China Illustrata, a book written by the Jesuit Athanasius Kircher (1602-1680) is published. It compiles the 17th century European knowledge on the Chinese Empire and its neighboring countries
 Imperial Regent Sonin died on 12 August 1667. His death provoked a series of changes in the regency: just as the other regents, led by Oboi, tried to consolidate their power, the Kangxi emperor vied to assert his own power.
 The imperial Deliberative Council investigates Suksaha after he retires as regent. Two days later on September 2, the Council ordered Suksaha and all his male kin arrested; on September 4, finding Suksaha guilty of twenty-four "grave crimes" and recommended that he and many of his male relatives be executed, along with many members of the imperial guard who had supposedly connived in Suksaha's schemes.
 Qing emissary Kong Yuanzhang is sent to Taiwan to convince Zheng Jing to surrender. Zheng refuses, citing prosperous trading conditions
 Russian former Qing soldier Gantimur, along with his relatives and forty elders of his tribe, went over to the Russians to seek an alliance. An immediate attempt made by the Qing authorities to secure his return by force was unsuccessful, and special envoys sent by order of the Kangxi Emperor were also unsuccessful persuading Gantimur to come back to the side of the Qing
 Ganlu Temple (Mount Jiuhua) originally built by an exceptional Chan master Dong'an 
 Wu Sangui submitted a request to the Kangxi Emperor, asking for permission to be relieved of his duties in Yunnan and Guizhou provinces, on the premise that he was ill, but Kangxi, not yet ready for a trial of strength with him, refused.
 Sino-Russian border conflicts
 Anhui province established

Births 
 Ye Tianshi (1667–1747) was a Chinese medical scholar who was the major proponent of the "school of warm diseases".

Deaths 
 Soni (索尼; 1601–1667), or Sonin, a Manchu of the Hešeri clan who served as one of the Four Regents

References

 
 .

 
China